The Joker King (Italian: Il re Burlone) is a 1935 Italian historical comedy film directed by Enrico Guazzoni and starring Luisa Ferida, Armando Falconi and Luigi Cimara.

It was shot at the Cines Studios in Rome.

Plot
In Naples, in the time of king Ferdinand II, a girl organized a plot against the monarch to avenge her father who was executed for his political views. The plan, which also involves some officers, includes the kidnapping of the king, but the attempt fails. At the end, the king will set them free to escape to the Papal States.

Cast

References

Bibliography 
 Moliterno, Gino. Historical Dictionary of Italian Cinema. Scarecrow Press, 2008.

External links 

1935 films
Italian historical comedy films
1930s historical comedy films
1930s Italian-language films
Films directed by Enrico Guazzoni
Films set in Italy
Films set in the 19th century
Italian black-and-white films
Cines Studios films
1935 comedy films
1930s Italian films